Çopurlu is a village in the Mersin Province, Turkey. It's part of Toroslar district (which is an intracity district within Mersin city). It is to the north of Çukurova Motorway which connects Mersin to Adana and Tarsus. The population of the village was 696 as of 2012.

References

Villages in Toroslar District